Croatian Cup may refer to:

Croatian Football Cup
Croatian Football Super Cup
Croatian Women's Football Cup
Croatian Basketball Cup, also known as Krešimir Ćosić Cup
Croatian Handball Cup
Croatian Water Polo Cup
Croatian Minute Movie Cup